Leningrad Province may refer to:
Leningrad Oblast, a federal subject of Russia
Leningrad Governorate, an administrative division of the Soviet Union